Johnson Home Farm was a historic home located near Taylor's Bridge, New Castle County, Delaware.  It was built about 1790, and was a two-story, five-bay, gable-roof, post-and-plank building with interior brick chimneys at each gable end. It has a center-passage plan with overall dimensions of 39 feet wide by 22 feet deep.  A two-story, wood-frame kitchen wing was added in the mid-19th century. It is in the Federal style.

It was listed on the National Register of Historic Places in 1992, and demolished before 2002.

References

Houses on the National Register of Historic Places in Delaware
Federal architecture in Delaware
Houses completed in 1790
Houses in New Castle County, Delaware
National Register of Historic Places in New Castle County, Delaware